The Battle of Woerth was fought on December 23, 1793 and resulted the victory of the French under General Louis Hoche against the Prussians under General Friedrich Freiherr von Hoetze. The Prussians' redoubts were taken at bayonet by the French soldiers.

References

Conflicts in 1793
Battles of the French Revolutionary Wars
Battles involving Prussia
1793 in France